Alliance for a Green Revolution in Africa (AGRA) is an organisation that seeks to transform African agriculture from a subsistence model to strong businesses that improve the livelihoods of the continent’s farming households.

AGRA is headquartered in Nairobi, Kenya, from where a team of African scientists, economists and business leaders supports its country operations and African governments. It was funded by the Bill and Melinda Gates Foundation and the Rockefeller Foundation.

The institution also has offices in 11 African countries, under the management of country leads, who oversee the deployment of the organisation’s national strategy.

History 
AGRA was founded in 2006 as an Africa-based and -led organization that works within the Comprehensive Africa Agricultural Development Program (CAADP), Africa's policy framework for agricultural transformation, wealth creation, food security and nutrition, economic growth and prosperity.

Former UN Secretary General, the Late Kofi Annan, was the organization’s first chairman and he served until 2013 when Econet Wireless Founder Strive Masiyiwa took over. Masiyiwa’s term ended in 2019. He was succeeded by former Ethiopian Prime Minister H.E. Hailemariam Desalegn.

AGRA has 211 employees from 24 nationalities of whom 42% are female and 58% male. About 61% of AGRA’s workers are technical staff. The organization is led by President Dr. Agnes Kalibata, who has held the office since 2014. She is deputized by Dr. Fadel Ndiame.

AGRA is among the key conveners of the annual Africa Green Revolution Forum (AGRF), a gathering that brings together presidents, heads of state and government, ministers, scientists, farmers, private sector payers and members of the civil society to chart the way forward for African agriculture. The AGRF is now its 11th year.

Countries of Operation 
AGRA has prioritized 11 countries in three agro-ecologies:

 The Guinea Savannah Zone: Ghana, Nigeria, Mali and Burkina Faso
 The East African Highlands: Ethiopia, Kenya, Uganda, Rwanda and Tanzania
 The Miombo Woodland: Malawi and Mozambique

Strategy 

AGRA's strategy is to double the yields and incomes of 30 million smallholder households in 11 countries by the end of 2021.  The organization’s impact is felt by:

 9 million smallholder farmer households, who are witnessing increased food security through AGRA’s direct interventions.
 21 million smallholder farmer households that are benefiting indirectly from AGRA’s partnerships, support to governments and Investments that unlock the engagement and power of the private sector.

According to the AGRA’s Half-Year 2020 M&E Progress Report, 10.14 million farmers (76% of target) are benefitting from extension activities and 7.72 million farmers adopted improved and yield enhancing technologies. Farmers benefitting from AGRA’s support now reported an increase in the number of months with sufficient food supply from 9.2 in 2016 to 11 months in 2019.

Strategic Interventions 
AGRA’s strategy is delivered through interventions in four priority areas; input systems, resilience building, innovative finance, and policy/country support.

Input systems

Working with both public and private sector players to develop the systems required for the sustained availability, delivery and adoption of improved seeds and fertilizer with a focus on getting these inputs into the hands of farmers.

Resilience building

Promoting interventions that enhance the resilience of the production system to climate change and climate variability. This is achieved by developing more efficient marketing systems, introducing post-harvest technologies to close yield gaps and ensure farmers can sustainably sell quality to consumer markets.

Innovative finance

Enabling local agri-businesses to access markets, support local and national financial institutions. This includes providing affordable financing to smallholder farmers and local SMEs.

Policy and country support

Supporting governments in the 11 focus countries to strengthen the national capacities to deepen and sustain the gains made through policy decisions and encourage significant investments of public resources into the agriculture sector.

Strategic partners 

AGRA is primarily guided by its partners across the continent, starting with the leadership of African states through the Comprehensive Africa Agriculture Development Programme (CAADP) coordination under the Malabo declaration. AGRA works closely with African governments, particularly in its eleven countries of operation, to whom it is accountable under national ownership of development leadership and governance. AGRA works under national development plans and National Agriculture Investment Plans (NAIPs). It also works in partnership with other national actors in the private sector, farmers organizations, the academic and research community, and civil society.

Projects 

 Development of disease-resistant strains of cassava. The genetically-engineered cassava are reportedly immune to cassava brown streak virus disease and the cassava common mosaic virus. 
 PhD programs at universities in Ghana and South Africa

Critiques 

Publications by the Oakland Institute have suggested that AGRA was planned without African voices, and imposes quick-fix technological solutions on complex and historically deep social issues, that it will impose a regime in which farmers lose power over their own seeds and are forced to buy them back from large corporations year after year. This system may also contribute to the marginalization of women. The conference compiled a set of papers containing various arguments:
There's also suggestions that hunger in Africa results more from poverty than from actual food shortages; people will not be able to buy any additional food that gets produced without larger systemic changes. 

In 2021, the Alliance for Food Sovereignty in Africa released an open letter with many signatories stating that AGRA had "failed in its mission to increase productivity and incomes and reduce food insecurity".

Publications 
Africa Agriculture Status Report – An annual publication highlighting the major trends in African agriculture, the drivers of those trends, and the emerging challenges that Africa's food systems face.

Food Security Monitor – A monthly publication providing the food security outlook in AGRA’s focus countries of around Africa.

AGRA Annual Reports.

References

External links 

 Alliance for a Green Revolution in Africa official website
 Africa Green Revolution Forum

External links 
 

Agricultural organisations based in Kenya
2006 establishments in Africa
International development in Africa